Gul Phul (Sindhi گل ڦل) is a children's magazine in Sindhi published by Sindhi Adabi Board.

History and profile

Gul Phul was started in 1959 and enjoys the status of being the first and oldest children's magazine in Sindhi. The magazine is based in Hyderabad. Its first editor was Ghulam Rabbani Agro. It contains short stories, articles, mathematics, poems, jokes, interviews and other things of interest to children. In February 2016 the editors of the magazine reported that it had not been published for the last five months due to lack of funds by the Sindhi Adabi.

References

External links
 WorldCat record

1959 establishments in Pakistan
Magazines established in 1959
Children's magazines published in Pakistan
Sindhi children's magazines
Mass media in Hyderabad, India